The Bipartisan Commission on Biodefense, formerly known as the Blue Ribbon Study Panel on Biodefense, is an organization of former high-ranking government officials that analyzes US capabilities and capacity to defend against biological threats. According to the Commission's mission statement, the organization was formed to "provide for a comprehensive assessment of the state of U.S. biodefense efforts, and to issue recommendations that will foster change."

The Commission is supported by donor organizations. Hudson Institute serves as the Commission's fiscal sponsor. Current donors include Open Philanthropy, Smith Richardson Foundation, and Bavarian Nordic.

Commissioners, staff, and ex officio members 

The Bipartisan Commission on Biodefense is co-chaired by former Senator Joe Lieberman and former Secretary of Homeland Security and Governor Tom Ridge.

Sources:

Background 
Between 2001 and 2014, the U.S. spent around $80 billion on biodefense. Beginning in fall 2014, the Bipartisan Commission on Biodefense conducted meetings, interviews, and research. It studied the 2001 anthrax attacks and biodefense programs undertaken during the Clinton, Bush, and Obama Administrations.

In October 2015, the Commission released its recommendations to publicly and submitted them to Congress in the form of a report, A National Blueprint for Biodefense: Leadership and Major Reform Needed to Optimize Efforts. They concluded that the United States was not prepared to respond to a large scale biological event - naturally occurring, accidentally released, or intentionally introduced. As for the cause of the problem, the report said, "Simply put, the Nation does not afford the biological threat the same level of attention as it does other threats."

A National Blueprint for Biodefense
The Bipartisan Commission on Biodefense conducted a year-long study of how the U.S. should address biological threats. The study covered human-generated (i.e., terrorism, warfare, accidents) and naturally occurring biological threats. The study culminated in a report to the public and Congress released on October 28, 2015.

The group's report was titled  A National Blueprint for Biodefense. The report described many biological threats, including those posed by the Islamic State and Al Qaeda, as well as nation states, and "mishandling of lethal biological agents by the U.S. government," as reasons for making biodefense a high national priority. This report contained 33 recommendations and 87 specific action items associated with those recommendations.

The report proposed congressional oversight hearings to address the following issues:
 Major biological threats
 Animal disease reporting
 Biomedical Advanced Research and Development Authority 
National Biodefense Strategy
Biosurveillance
 Budgeting for biodefense
 Cyber vulnerabilities to the life sciences industry
 Food supply protection and response
 Global health security and response
 Medical countermeasures (MCM) innovation
 Military-civilian biodefense collaboration
 Origin of active pharmaceutical ingredients (API)
 PHEMCE coordination of MCM efforts
 Select Agent Program
 Vulnerable populations

Major Problems Identified 

In the Blueprint for Biodefense report, the Commission said that almost no urgency within the federal government for dealing with the risk of a biological event existed.

The report stated that the government does not appear to take events related to biodefense seriously enough. One member stated, "The tragic saga of the death of Thomas Eric Duncan from Ebola Virus Disease (EVD) serves as a perfect demonstration of the shambolic state of biodefense in the United States in late 2014." Another estimated that the consequences of inaction on Commission recommendations would be that the report would serve as a "guidebook for placing blame."

The Commission also noted that the federal government had also failed to update its practices and procedures as they relate to biological threats. For example, there is a system within the National Institutes of Health and Food and Drug Administration that would fast-track the approval of medical countermeasures in the event of a biological attack. However, during a hearing with the Senate Committee on Homeland Security and Governmental Affairs, Governor Tom Ridge stated that the fast-track process is obsolete. Page 52 of the report reads, "A systemic, risk averse culture has emerged that is stifling innovation. If this continues to evolve, progress on biodefense objectives will be curtained and the still nascent biodefence industry will have little incentive to participate."

Another example is the practice of stockpiling vaccines against a biological agent. This practice is considered obsolete by some. Nation states and terrorist organizations are already able to "merge the toxic attributes of more than one agent." To replace vaccine stockpiles, the Panel recommended a "vaccines-on-demand approach."

Need to Strengthen White House Leadership of the National Biodefense Enterprise 
One of the Commission's major recommendations was to place responsibility for biodefense leadership into the hands of the Office of the Vice President of the United States. By doing so, biodefense would have "the ear of the president and the ability to coordinate budgets and plans across agencies." In such a scenario, the White House Biodefense Coordination Council would execute the day-to-day work, Senator Lieberman said during testimony in front of the House Homeland Security Committee. By making the Vice President responsible for biodefense, it would "transcend the bureaucratic and budgetary rivalries of various agencies in order to create an effective platform for dealing with biological attacks."

Among the eleven new recommendations found in Biodefense in Crisis (the Commission's second status report describing federal implementation of its recommendations from A National Blueprint for Biodefense), the Commission advises the President to establish a dedicated Deputy National Security Advisor for Biodefense, overseen by the Vice President and supported by NSC staff. The Commission clearly notes that one federal department cannot tell other departments and agencies what to do, especially in a critical area of responsibility like biodefense. A dedicated higher-level leader in the White House without responsibilities for multiple weapons of mass destruction, terrorist avenues, and national disasters is crucial.

Need for a National Biodefense Strategy 
Dr. George told Homeland Preparedness News that in order for the government's defense against a biological attack to be sufficient, a new comprehensive program needs to be developed. The programs and activities under a new approach would need to be "coordinated, collaborative and innovative." The report recommends that all types of biological threats should be addressed by a single comprehensive strategy. By different types, they meant biological warfare, bioterrorism, naturally occurring deadly disease, and accidental release.

In accordance with the Commission's third recommendation from A National Blueprint for Biodefense, on September 18, 2018, President Donald Trump released the 2018 National Biodefense Strategy and signed National Security Presidential Memorandum 14 to direct the federal government to execute this strategy. Together, they sought to improve the federal government's readiness and capability to respond to human-generated, naturally-occurring, and accidentally-released biological threats to the Nation. The Strategy was mandated by Congress and has five extensively detailed goals. It established a new cabinet-level Biodefense Steering Committee chaired by the Secretary of Health and Human Services. National Security Advisor John Bolton said, "The Biodefense Steering Committee will monitor and coordinate implementation of the National Biodefense Strategy across 15 federal agencies and the Intelligence Community." The Bipartisan Commission on Biodefense commended the Trump Administration for creating the strategy in accordance with the Commission's third recommendation in its National Blueprint for Biodefense.

Need for a Biological Attribution Apparatus 
The Commission held a public meeting on October 3, 2017 about the biological attribution of crime, terrorism, and warfare, and continues to pursue this important topic. The continuing debate and uncertainty surrounding the origins of COVID-19 demonstrate the need for biological attribution. Biological attribution refers to the process of determining who and what was responsible for a biological attack. Perpetrators could be criminals, terrorists, or state actors. During this meeting, the Commission learned about the federal government's existing capabilities to determine the sources and characteristics of deadly pathogens. The Commission has taken a particular interest in the National Bioforensics Analysis Center (NBFAC). In fiscal year 2013, the NBFAC supported more than 45 investigations of potential biological crimes. Previously run by the Department of Homeland Security (DHS), the Commission recommended that the Federal Bureau of Investigation (FBI) assume management of the NBFAC, as all specimens going into the facility come from the FBI. In 2018, DHS and the FBI signed a memorandum of agreement that transferred NBFAC management to the FBI.

Need to Budget for Biodefense 

In its February 2018 report, Budget Reform for Biodefense: Integrated Budget Needed to Increase Return on Investment, the Commission noted increasing threats to the United States and its interests overseas, and determined that the U.S. government can no longer wait to commit sufficient federal funds to biodefense. Waiting is not in the best interest of the health of Americans nor the country's national security. The Commission released its report to the public and Congress in 2018.

One of the key budgeting issues identified by the Commission is that all federal departments and many federal agencies have some biodefense responsibilities. Despite this multiplicity, there is not enough coordination. Lieberman said the Office of Management and Budget (OMB) does not know how much the federal government spends on biodefense because "the sad fact is, more than two dozen agencies are working in silos across biodefense; that increases our vulnerabilities. Once we have a strategy and match that strategy with budget reforms...that's the beginning of a much more effective biodefense national strategy." Economic impacts of a catastrophic outbreak could reach $1 trillion, Lieberman noted.

The report recommends that the OMB each year submit "an integrated budget request to Congress that outlines federal-wide biodefense spending, and how it is tied to mission objectives." In 2019, congressional Appropriations directed OMB to conduct a biodefense budget cross-cut that would inform the budget request, in accordance with one of the Commission's recommendations. While the report also asks Congress to create a bipartisan, bicameral Biodefense Working Group to come up with budgeting solutions, Congress has yet to establish such a Group. The House of Representatives, however, has established a Biodefense Caucus.

Need to Prepare for Large-Scale Biological Events 
Commissioners and experts agreed during a public Commission meeting held in Miami, FL in January 2018 that in order to respond effectively during a large-scale biological event due to a terrorist attack or natural disaster, the public and private sectors need to coordinate. The Commission also noted that obstacles exist that highlight the Nation's vulnerabilities to such an event. The Commission concluded that a comprehensive public health system that is able to respond before a biological disaster strikes is critical.

In an op-ed in the Miami Herald on January 15, 2018, former Secretary of Health and Human Services Donna Shalala said that during a large biological event, "I know that the federal government would move resources to affected areas throughout the United States. But those resources are already too few, and the federal government does not respond quickly to multiple locations in distress." Shalala's comments were prescient and perfectly described the federal response to the COVID-19 pandemic as it spread to the United States in 2020.

Need for a Stratified National Biodefense Hospital System 
A "stratified biodefense hospital system would provide the United States with a protective shield in the event the country experiences a manmade or natural biological catastrophe," speakers told members of the Bipartisan Commission on Biodefense in a January 2018 public meeting, according to Homeland Preparedness News. The public hearing occurred during the same week that the Senate began holding hearings on the Pandemic and All-Hazards Preparedness Act (PAHPA), which was due for reauthorization in September 2018. Information sharing across state, local, tribal, and territorial (SLTT) governments was another large theme during the public meeting. In its December 2016 Biodefense Indicators report, the Commission recommended that the federal government "redouble its efforts to share information with SLTT governments" and described various action items to do so.

Need for a One Health Approach to Biodefense 
The report also suggested that the government merge duplicate processes by including all biological threats, not just those from terrorism, into a national strategy. For example, the "One Health approach" is one recommendation made by the Commission that would merge strategies for dealing with human, animal, and plant health biodefense programs.

Need to Defend Food and Agriculture Against Biological Threats 
In December 2018, President Trump signed the Agricultural Improvement Act of 2018 (H.R. 2), also known as The Farm Bill. The legislation addressed Commission recommendations to defend U.S. food and agriculture. The new law creates a National Animal Disease Preparedness and Response Program and a National Animal Vaccine and Veterinary Countermeasures Bank, and increases federal funding to stockpile medical countermeasures for animals.

Need to Address Science and Technology for Biodefense 
The Bipartisan Commission on Biodefense also called for the new Innovation Funds at the National Institutes of Health, and for ten percent of those funds to be dedicated to building technology that would allow multiple antigens in a countermeasure to be delivered from a single platform. Similarly, the Commission called for ten percent of funds from the Biomedical Advanced Research and Development Authority (BARDA) for the same purpose.

Recommendations from A National Blueprint for Biodefense 
The National Blueprint for Biodefense laid out 33 recommendations and 87 associated action items. The primary actions the U.S. government should take, according to the Commission's report, are the following:

Status of Federal Implementation of the Commission's Recommendations 
On the anniversary of the arrival of COVID-19 in the United States, the Commission released a report in March 2021 describing the status of federal implementation of recommendations from A National Blueprint for Biodefense. In this report, Biodefense in Crisis: Immediate Action Needed to Address National Vulnerabilities, the Commission noted that as of January 2021 and out of its 87 recommended action items, the federal government had completed 3, took some action to address 54, no action on 24, and emergency or crisis actions (that may or may not result in permanent change) on 6 in response to the COVID-19 pandemic.

This new analysis from the Bipartisan Commission on Biodefense reveals that the United States remains at catastrophic biological risk. The Commission urges the Administration and Congress to take more actions now to avoid another pandemic or biological attack. The report closely examines the extent of progress that has been made since the Commission released its seminal National Blueprint for Biodefense in 2015. Despite warnings from public health professionals, experts, and the Commission, the country was caught unprepared for the COVID-19 pandemic. The Nation remains dangerously vulnerable to biological threats, despite some gains in preparedness and response.

“The COVID-19 pandemic was predictable,” said Commission Co-Chair, former Senator Joe Lieberman. “That is what our Commission learned from the experts we have consulted since we began operations in 2014. This global crisis resulted from a foreseeable combination of mutations, lack of immunity, poor preparedness, limited surveillance, and failure to learn from past pandemics. When our Commission released its National Blueprint for Biodefense in 2015, we concluded that our recommendations could and should be implemented by the Executive and Legislative Branches within five years. However, out of our 87 recommended action items, the government has completed just 3, took some action to address 54, no action on 24, and emergency or crisis actions on 6 in response to the COVID-19 pandemic. We are still more vulnerable to the next pandemic than we should be.”

“While the current spotlight on COVID-19 is necessary and urgent, it would be a costly mistake to focus solely on this pandemic to the exclusion of all other biological threats,” said Commission Co-Chair, former Secretary of Homeland Security Tom Ridge. “Nation-states such as China, Iran, North Korea, and Russia continue to invest heavily in advancing biotechnology and could produce biological agents and weapons. Terrorist organizations also remain interested in learning how to attack enemies with biological agents. National biodefense must begin and end with strong national leadership. The efforts of all federal departments and agencies with responsibilities for biodefense need to be coordinated, and they must be held accountable, by the White House.”

Among the eleven new recommendations in the report, the Commission advises the President to establish a dedicated Deputy National Security Advisor for Biodefense, overseen by the Vice President and supported by NSC staff. The Commission clearly notes that one federal department cannot tell other departments and agencies what to do, especially in a critical area of responsibility like biodefense. A dedicated higher-level leader in the White House without responsibilities for multiple weapons of mass destruction, terrorist avenues, and national disasters is crucial.

The Commission also continues to recommend eliminating the ineffective BioWatch program. Current BioWatch technology performs poorly and is far from the deterrence mechanism it was originally intended to be. It uses limited, decades-old collection equipment that only provides data hours or days after a biological event. Congressional appropriators should deny further funding to BioWatch activities until proven replacement technology is identified and confirmed to meet the needs of the Biodetection 2021 acquisition program.

Other reports and publications 
Since the release of its National Blueprint for Biodefense, the Commission has released nine other reports: Biodefense Indicators: One Year Later, Events Outpacing Federal Efforts to Defend the Nation (December 2016); Defense of Animal Agriculture (October 2017); and Budget Reform for Biodefense: Integrated Budget Needed to Increase Return on Investment (2018); Holding The Line On Biodefense: State, Local, Tribal, and Territorial Reinforcements Needed (October 2018); Diagnostics for Biodefense - Flying Blind with No Plan to Land (November 2020); The Apollo Program for Biodefense: Winning the Race Against Biological Threats (2021); Biodefense in Crisis: Immediate Action Needed to Address National Vulnerabilities (2021), Insidious Scourge: Critical Infrastructure at Biological Risk (2021), and Saving Sisyphus: Advanced Biodetection for the 21st Century.

In early 2019, author Max Brooks partnered with the Commission to author and publish a graphic novel called GERM WARFARE: A Very Graphic History. Brooks is the author of World War Z and is a non-resident fellow at the Modern War Institute at West Point. The novel "depicts previous biological warfare events, the possibilities for the future, and the continued need for public health security."

Activities 
The Commission's bipartisan activities include meetings, research, issuing reports, testifying before Congress, and meeting with officials at the White House.

Dr. George said that the Commission would stay engaged with Congress to help it understand and make the improvements that the Commission recommended.

Previously, the Commission teamed up with the Alliance for Biosecurity, and Trust for America's Health to conduct a survey of Americans' thoughts about biosecurity. According to the Alliance, Americans are concerned about biological threats.

Grants 
In September 2016, the Open Philanthropy Project gave the Commission a $1.3 million grant in support of the panel's influential leadership role in the evaluation of the nation's biodefense systems. Tom Ridge said, "It is troubling that we still do not have a comprehensive approach to preparing for and responding to biological events. That is why this grant from Open Philanthropy is so critical. It will allow us to push forward the recommendations detailed in our National Blueprint and seek to put them into action."

In February 2018, the Open Philanthropy Project gave the Commission a grant for $2.5 million to advance biodefense leadership and reduce catastrophic biological risk. “Estimates show that as many as 100 million people died in 1918 from pandemic influenza,” Lieberman said. “That was before we were traveling as often as we do today, and well before commerce became globalized. Since then, the world has gotten smaller, but the threat has not. Far more needs to be done to prepare for another catastrophic biological event – whether manmade or from nature. With this in mind, the support we receive today from Open Philanthropy will allow us to further advance the recommendations the Panel identified in our National Blueprint for Biodefense and subsequent reports. We thank Open Philanthropy for their leadership and support on this critical issue.”

On March 16, 2020, the Open Philanthropy Project gave the Commission a grant for $2.6 million to help defend America against biological threats. About the timing of the grant, Governor Ridge noted that it, "...comes in the midst of our national response to novel coronavirus and other highly pathogenic diseases, the development of biological weapons by other nation-states, and the ongoing threat of bioterrorism." Added Senator Lieberman, "The biological threats to our Nation remain all too real."

The Commission has also received grants from Smith Richardson Foundation and NTI.

See also 

 9/11 Commission
 Biological hazard
Biological warfare
 Bioterrorism
 Pandemic influenza
 Terrorism
 United States biological defense program

References

External links
 Report - "A National Blueprint for Biodefense" (2015)
Report - "Biodefense Indicators: One Year Later, Events Outpacing Federal Efforts to Defend the Nation" (2016)
Report - "Defense of Animal Agriculture" (2017)
Report - "Budget Reform for Biodefense: Integrated Budget Needed to Increase Return on Investment" (2018)
Report - "Holding the Line on Biodefense: State, Local, Tribal, and Territorial Reinforcements Needed" (2018)
 
 "Defending Against Bioterrorism: How Vulnerable is America?" House Committee on Homeland Security hearing (2015)
 Hearing on Biodefense Preparedness (with witnesses from BRSPB) on C-SPAN (video)
 Panel Discussion on Bioterrorism, Pandemics, and Preparing for the Future - moderated by author Max Brooks (2017)

Biological warfare
Bioterrorism
Public inquiries in the United States
National security of the United States